Portobello Vegan Trattoria was an Italian restaurant specializing in plant-based cuisine in Portland, Oregon's Hosford-Abernethy neighborhood, in the United States.

The restaurant was co-founded by Dinae Horne and Aaron Adams in December 2008. Adams sold his part of the company in 2014. Portobello closed on December 31, 2016, after hosting a New Year's Eve party.

See also

 List of defunct restaurants of the United States
 List of Italian restaurants

References

External links
 Portobello Vegan Trattoria at Zagat
 Portobello Vegan Trattoria at Zomato

2008 establishments in Oregon
2016 disestablishments in Oregon
Defunct Italian restaurants in Portland, Oregon
Hosford-Abernethy, Portland, Oregon
Restaurants disestablished in 2016
Restaurants established in 2008